Acacia homaloclada, also commonly known as Hitchinbrook wattle, is a shrub of the genus Acacia and the subgenus Plurinerves that is endemic to north eastern Australia. It is listed as vulnerable according to the 1992 Nature Conservation Act.

Description
It has branchlets that are flattened towards the extremities with pink coloured new shoots. Like most species of Acacia it has phyllodes rather than true leaves. It blooms between November and December producing yellow coloured flowers.

Taxonomy
The species was first formally described by the botanist Ferdinand von Mueller in 1878 as a part of the work Fragmenta Phytographiae Australiae. It was reclassified as Racosperma homalocladum by Leslie Pedley in 1987 then transferred back to genus Acacia in 2001.

Distribution
The shrub has a limited range in north Queensland from around Ingham including Hinchinbrook Island where it is not common. It is usually found along watercourses as a part of open Eucalypt woodland communities growing in sandy soils.

See also
List of Acacia species

References

homaloclada
Flora of Queensland
Taxa named by Ferdinand von Mueller